, previously known as , is a Japanese regional airline headquartered in Sapporo, Japan. It operates scheduled service between the islands of Honshu and Hokkaido in cooperation with All Nippon Airways, from its hubs at New Chitose Airport in Sapporo and Haneda Airport in Tokyo.

History 

Hamada gathered investments from 29 other individuals who were interested in establishing a low-cost airline to compete with Japan's major domestic carriers (All Nippon Airways, Japan Airlines, and Japan Air System) on flights between Hokkaido cities and Tokyo. Additional capital was raised from Kyocera, Tokio Marine & Fire Insurance, Hokkaido Electric Power Company and other institutional investors, as well as from Hokkaido local governments seeking less expensive air service to Tokyo.

The company started flight operations on the Tokyo-Sapporo route, using the Air Do brand, in December 1998. Its first CEO was the former Japan-based manager of Virgin Atlantic. Maintenance and ground handling services were outsourced to Japan Airlines. Air Do enjoyed very high load factors during its first few months of operation, as its fares were 60% to 70% of the walk-up fares offered by established airlines.

However, other airlines quickly adopted their own discounted advance purchase fares in the wake of Air Do's initial success, driving load factors down to around 50%. In 2000, The Hokkaido prefectural government injected more capital and installed one of its senior officials as head of the company. After being significantly impacted financially in the aftermath of the September 11, 2001 attacks, and being denied additional financing from the Hokkaido prefectural government, Air Do entered Japanese corporate restructuring procedures in June 2002.

Air Do received new equity capital from a tokumei kumiai investment fund arranged by the Development Bank of Japan (DBJ), in which All Nippon Airways was a key investor. This began a number of business relationships between Air Do and ANA, including ANA code sharing on Air Do operated flights and Air Do leasing additional 767 and 737 aircraft from ANA. The fund was dissolved in September 2008 and DBJ, ANA and other investors became direct shareholders in Air Do.

On October 1, 2012, the company's legal name was changed from Hokkaido International Airlines Co., Ltd. to AIRDO Co., Ltd.

Air Do was sanctioned by the Japanese government in December 2014 for promoting a first officer to captain despite poor performance in training. Following the business improvement order, Air Do in January 2015 moved to eliminate its lowest-yielding routes to Niigata, Toyama, Fukushima and Komatsu.

In May 2021, Air Do and Solaseed Air announced their intentions to merge as a result of operating difficulties during the COVID-19 pandemic. In July 2021, Air Do shareholders approved a proposal to issue US$63.2 million of preferred shares to improve finances prior to the business integration. The new holding company for both airlines, RegionalPlus Wings, was officially established on October 3, 2022.

Corporate affairs 

The company's president is Susumu Kusano, who was appointed to the position on June 27, 2019.

Destinations 
Over its history, Air Do has operated scheduled services to the following destinations in Japan :

Codeshare agreements
Air Do has a codeshare agreement with All Nippon Airways.

Fleet

Current fleet

The Air Do fleet consists of the following aircraft :

Former fleet

The airline previously operated the following aircraft types:

Frequent-flyer program
Air Do operates a frequent-flyer program called My AIRDO. Points under the program are accrued based on the fare amount when purchasing tickets for travel with the airline, with registration to join the program available for Japanese residents.

References

External links

Official website
Official website 

Regional airlines of Japan
Airlines established in 1996
Japanese companies established in 1996
Low-cost carriers
Companies based in Sapporo
Japanese brands
Transport in Hokkaido